Hardee's IcePlex was a 2,200-seat multi-purpose arena in Chesterfield, Missouri. At one time, the  facility was the largest ice skating facility in Missouri. Hardee's IcePlex had two regulation National Hockey League size rinks (85’ x 200’) with 600 seat capacities each. The facility's main rink was an Olympic regulation size rink (100’ x 200’). The Olympic rink had a seating capacity of 2,200. The IcePlex also had a Total Hockey franchise inside the arena as well as a restaurant. 

Hardee's IcePlex closed in May 2017 as the owner of the facility sold the property to Dallas-based TopGolf.''Tenants

The arena was the home for local high school teams, in house program and the St. Louis AAA Blues. The facility was also used for public skating, figure skating and  
Former ten ice hockey team prior to that.  It was built in 1995 and was also used for ice skating and high school hockey.

Former tenants
St. Louis Blues (only for practice)- Moved to the IceZone at St. Louis Outlet Mall.
St. Louis Heartland Eagles- defunct USHL franchise.
St. Louis University Hockey Team - Moved to Webster Ice Arena.
St. Louis Bandits- defunct NAHL franchise.

History
The arena opened in 1995 as the U.S. Ice Sports Complex In 2002 the arena was bought by Summit Development and the arena changed its name to Summit Center.
On February 19, 2008 the name was changed to the Hardee's IcePlex''' reflecting the 7-year naming rights deal between the arena and Hardee's, a St. Louis based fast food Corporation.
In 2017, the arena was bought by TopGolf and completely demolished. As of 2022, the parking lot of the former arena serves as the parking lot for the Saint Louis TopGolf.

References 

http://fox2now.com/2016/05/11/hardees-iceplex-sold-to-dallas-based-top-golf/

External links
Official website

Indoor arenas in Missouri
Sports venues in St. Louis
Indoor ice hockey venues in Missouri
Sports venues in Missouri
Former buildings and structures in St. Louis